Jahidpur is a village in the 4th ward of Dolarbazar Union in the south-eastern part of Chhatak Upazila in the Sunamganj District of Bangladesh's Sylhet Division.

Geography
Jahidpur is situated on the southern bank of Makunda River. The village is 2 km long from east to west.

Nearby villages
 North-East: Rampur - Muhammadpur and Vawal.
 North: Alampur and Chandpur
 North-West: Sherpur and Chelarpar
 West: Anujani-Boratuka, meoatoil
 South-West: Basantopur
 South: Kachurkandi, Gobinda Pur, and Jugol Nogor (across haor).
 South-East: Norshinghpur-Talupat and Sutarkhali.
 East: Buraiya, Chisrawoli, Khaghata.

Demographics
According to the 2011 Bangladesh census, Jahidpur had 1,548 households and a population of 9,881. The literacy rate (age 7 and over) was 51.4%, compared to the national average of 51.8%.

Economy
Most of the villagers work in agriculture. Expatriates from the village support it economically.

Government offices
The Jahidpur post office formerly served 30 surrounding villages. Its post code number is 3087.

The Jahidpur police inspection centre was established on 29 September 2018.

Education
There is one primary school (Jahidpur Government Primary School) established in 1900; one secondary school (Jahidpur High School) and  one Dakhil (secondary) madrasa, and one Hafizia Madrasa.

There was an Aided Girls primary School, established in 1961, which was merged with Jahidpur Government Primary School by the Education Authority in 1972.

See also
 List of villages in Bangladesh

References

Villages in Chhatak Upazila